Zork is an interactive computer game.

Zork may also refer to:

 Zork (wine), an alternative wine closure
 ŽORK Jagodina, a handball club
 ŽORK Napredak Kruševac, a handball club